The discography of the South Korean girl group Red Velvet consists of three studio albums, fourteen extended plays, one reissue album, one compilation album, twenty eight singles, one promotional single and seven soundtrack appearances.

Red Velvet was formed by the South Korean entertainment company SM Entertainment in 2014, and initially consisted of four members; Irene, Seulgi, Wendy and Joy. The group debuted in 2014 with the release of their single "Happiness". In 2015, Yeri joined the group, and their first EP and first studio album, Ice Cream Cake and The Red were released. In 2016 saw the release of their EPs, The Velvet and Russian Roulette.

In February 2017, their fourth EP, Rookie was released. The group released a "special summer" EP The Red Summer in July 2017. Their sophomore studio album, Perfect Velvet was released in November 2017, with the lead single, "Peek-a-Boo". The album debuted at number-one at the Billboard World Albums chart, which marked their fourth number-one album on the chart, making them the K-pop girl group with the most number-one albums on the chart. A repackage of the album titled The Perfect Red Velvet was released in January 2018.

In 2018, their debut Japanese EP, #Cookie Jar was released along with EPs, Summer Magic and RBB. In 2019, their second Japanese EP Sappy was released. It was followed by The ReVe Festival trilogy with the releases of "Zimzalabim" from The ReVe Festival: Day 1, "Umpah Umpah" from The ReVe Festival: Day 2 and "Psycho" from the compilation album The ReVe Festival: Finale.

In 2021, the EP Queendom and the lead single of the same name was released. In 2022 saw the release of The ReVe Festival 2022 – Feel My Rhythm, the Japanese studio album Bloom and The ReVe Festival 2022 – Birthday.

To date, Red Velvet have earned twelve number-one albums and two number-one singles in South Korea. The group holds the record for having the most number-one albums for a girl group in South Korea.

Studio albums

Reissue studio albums

Compilation albums

Extended plays

Singles

Promotional singles

Soundtrack appearances

Other charted songs

Notes

References

External links
 

Discography
Discographies of South Korean artists
K-pop music group discographies